Edwards's long-tailed giant rat (Leopoldamys edwardsi) is a species of rodent in the family Muridae.
It is found in China, India, Indonesia, Laos, Malaysia, Burma, Thailand, and Vietnam.

References

Leopoldamys
Rodents of China
Rodents of India
Rodents of Myanmar
Rodents of Laos
Rodents of Vietnam
Rodents of Cambodia
Rodents of Thailand
Rodents of Indonesia
Rodents of Malaysia
Mammals described in 1882
Taxa named by Oldfield Thomas
Taxonomy articles created by Polbot